The 2005 Northamptonshire County Council election took place on 5 May 2005 to elect members of Northamptonshire County Council, England. The whole council was up for election and the Conservative Party gained overall control of the council from the Labour Party.

Background
The 2005 election to Northamptonshire County Council coincided with the 2005 general election, this meant that turnout was significantly higher than is usual for local government elections. However, between 1997 and 2005 County Council Elections coincided with General Elections, meaning that turnout was significantly higher than would otherwise be expected. Every seat was single member, elected using the First Past the Post system used for most local elections in England and Wales.

Election results
Mirroring national trends the election saw a swing away from the social democratic Labour Party towards the centre-right Conservative Party, with the Liberal Democrats picking up a few more seats. The Conservatives captured the council ending 12 years of Labour control and producing the first Conservative majority administration in 28 years, and only the second since the councils formation in 1973. Turnout was 63.8% up 1.2% on 2001 and 28 new Councillors joined the council. Note that there was a General Election at the same time as the county election in 2005 - this generally increases the numbers of people who turn out to vote in both elections which take place at the same time and place. (See for comparison the Northamptonshire County Council Election in 2009 when there was no General Election.)

|}

Division by Division Results by County Borough

 In order of number of votes with the winning candidate first

Corby Borough

Daventry District

East Northants District

Kettering Borough

Northampton Borough

South Northamptonshire District

Wellingborough Borough

References

2005 English local elections
2005
2000s in Northamptonshire